Per Hurum (2 June 1910 – 5 December 1989) was a Norwegian sculptor.

Biography
Hurum was born in Kristiania (now Oslo), Norway.  He was the son of Hans Hurum (1869–1934) and Anna Ording (1876–1956). His brother was music critic Hans Jørgen Hurum (1906–2001). He graduated artium and first attended  trade school. He was a student in the paint class at the Norwegian National Academy of Craft and Art Industry 1929–1930. He followed with one year studying drawing at Ateneum in Helsinki. He  became a student of Halfdan Strøm 1931–32 and of Wilhelm Rasmussen 1932–34.

He was awarded the Conrad Mohr's legacy (1938) and A.C. Houens fond (1946–47). He conducted a number of study trips including to Copenhagen (1935; 1947–48),  Paris (1937) and  Stockholm (1947–48). He also conducted trips to Germany, Italy, England and Greece.

He won first prize for the completion of several public works including Arbeidermonumentet at Youngstorget in  Oslo (1937, prize divided by four other sculptors), decoration of Rådhusplassen in  Oslo (1939, together with E. Lie), krigsmonumentet at Fredrikstad (1947) and 
the Christian Krohg Monument (1950–60, together with Asbjørg Borgfelt). One of his most recognized  works is the two piece grouping  Mor og barn (bronze, 1939–1944) which was completed with Asbjørg Borgfelt at the City Hall Square in Oslo. 

He received a State Art Salary from 1957 and was awarded the  King's Medal of Merit (Kongens fortjenstmedalje) in gold.

Personal life
In 1937 he married sculptor Asbjørg Borgfelt.

References

1910 births
1989 deaths
Artists from Oslo
Oslo National Academy of the Arts alumni
20th-century Norwegian sculptors
Recipients of the King's Medal of Merit in gold
Burials at Vestre gravlund